The International Cinematographers Guild (IATSE Local 600) represents approximately 8,400 members who work throughout the United States, Canada and the rest of the world in film and television as Directors of Photography, Camera Operators, Camera Assistants (1st AC, 2nd AC), Digital Imaging Technicians, Still Photographers, and all members of camera crews.

History
The first cinematographers union, International Alliance of Theatrical Stage Employees Local 644 was established in New York in 1926, followed by unions in Los Angeles and Chicago, but it wasn't until 1996 that Local 600 was born as a national guild. In 2015 the Guild chose Rebecca Rhine as its first female executive director.

Archive
The International Cinematographers Guild Interview Collection is housed at the Academy Film Archive. The collection contains nearly 300 oral and visual history interviews.

ICG Magazine
The official publication of the guild is the International Cinematographers Guild Magazine (ICG Magazine). First published in February 1929 as the International Photographer, it changed its name to ICG Magazine in 1999. Its current executive director is David Geffner, who previously worked in postproduction for Paramount Pictures and The Walt Disney Company, and in story creation for Walt Disney Animation. Film professor Jack Anderson praised ICG Magazine, saying that it "can compete with American Cinematographer", which is the "standard journal for the technical end of the industry."

References

External links 
 
 ICG Magazine
 "600LIVE!"
 International Photographer Magazine, complete issues 1929-1940 at the Internet Archive

International Alliance of Theatrical Stage Employees
Entertainment industry unions
Cinematography organizations
Trade unions established in 1996